Galin may refer to:

People
Dmitri Galin (born 1989), Russian football player
Mitchell Galin, American film and television producer
Pierre Galin (1786–1822), French music educator

Places
Galin, Iran (disambiguation)